Tephritis darjeelingensis is a species of tephritid or fruit flies in the genus Tephritis of the family Tephritidae.

Distribution
India.

References

Tephritinae
Insects described in 1992
Diptera of Asia